Israel Jenkins House, also known as The Elms, is a historic home located near Marion, in Monroe Township, Grant County, Indiana.  It was built about 1840, and is a -story, vernacular Greek Revival style, double pile brick dwelling.  It has a side gable roof.  Also on the property is a contributing 19th century English barn, silo, and long storage shed.

It was listed on the National Register of Historic Places in 2003.

References

Houses on the National Register of Historic Places in Indiana
Greek Revival houses in Indiana
Houses completed in 1840
Buildings and structures in Grant County, Indiana
National Register of Historic Places in Grant County, Indiana